Bromsgrove School Mission Hills, also known as Bromsgrove-Mission Hills International School of Shenzhen (BMH), is a British international bilingual school in Longhua District, Shenzhen, Guangdong, China, affiliated with Bromsgrove School in the United Kingdom and the Chinese leisure and hospitality company Mission Hills Group. Peter Clague is the headmaster as of 2019. It is one of eight schools in Shenzhen designated for the children of foreign workers as of 2018. Anna Packman is the Head of both the Pre and Prep school. BMH is open to Chinese students.

The Prep school currently has classes from Prep 1 to Prep 5 (2018-2019). In the 2019-20 school year, BMH will add Prep 6. There is a homeroom teacher (English) and a co-teacher in P1-3 classes (Chinese). This model will be changed for Prep 4-6 beginning in the 2019-2020 school year.

Chinese, English, Inquiry (bilingual), Maths (taught in Chinese), PE, Art, and Music are currently offered to Prep 1-5 students. The school's technology includes six iPads for each class and a computer lab with 24 desktop computers.

See also
 Education in Shenzhen

References

External links
 Bromsgrove School Mission Hills

British international schools in China
International schools in Shenzhen
Longhua District, Shenzhen
Private schools in Guangdong